

Buildings and structures

Buildings
 900–910 – Construction of Phnom Bakheng, the center of the Khmer Empire capital Yasodharapura.
 908 – Monastery of the Mother of God (Lips Monastery) inaugurated in Constantinople.
 c. 910 – Construction of the Governor's Palace in the Maya city of Uxmal.
 910 – Souillac Abbey founded.
 913 – Minden Cathedral founded.
 936 – Gndevank monastery founded in Armenia.
 938 – St Martin's Church, Tours fortified.
 953 – East Mebon consecrated in Angkor.
 941–942 – Kaminarimon, the eight-pillared gate to the Sensō-ji Buddhist temple in Tokyo, Japan, is erected in its original location.
 943 – Rudra Mahalaya Temple in Siddhpur, India, begun.
 945 – Palace of Medina Azahara first occupied as the new capital of the Emirate of Córdoba (begun c. 936; construction continues until c. 961).
 946 – Clermont-Ferrand Cathedral in the Auvergne consecrated.
 c. 950–1050 – St Nicholas' Church, Worth, England first built.
 c. 960–969 – Convent church of St. Cyriakus, Gernrode in the Marca Geronis constructed.
 961 – Tiger Hill Pagoda (Yunyan Pagoda or Huqiu Tower) of Suzhou, China is completed (begun in 907).
 962 – Pre Rup temple built in Angkor, Cambodia.
 963 – Second abbey at Cluny begun.
 965 – Reconstruction of St. Maria im Kapitol, Cologne begun.
 967 – Tribhuvanamahesvara (Great Lord of the Threefold World) temple (modern name Banteay Srei) consecrated in the Khmer Empire.
 968 – Construction of Baksei Chamkrong in the Khmer Empire.
 c. 970
 Muktesvara deula in Bhubaneswar, Odisha, completed.
 Palace temple of Phimeanakas in Angkor constructed.
 Tower nave of All Saints' Church, Earls Barton, England, built.
 972 – Construction of al-Azhar Mosque, Cairo complete.
 973 – Foundation of Cairo, capital of Fatimid Egypt.
 974 – Construction of Saint-Michel-de-Cuxa, Catalonia complete.
 975 – Mainz Cathedral begun.
 977 – Longhua Pagoda in Shanghai, China is begun.
 980 – St. Pantaleon's Church, Cologne built (the notable Westwork dates back to this period).
 980s – Saint-Pierre-de-Jumièges constructed.
 987 – Last enlargement campaign on the Great Mosque of Cordoba in the Emirate of Córdoba, bringing the monument close to its modern-day aspect.
 990s – Notre-Dame de la Basse-Œuvre, Beauvais constructed.
 999 – Bab-al-Mardum Mosque built in Toledo, Emirate of Cordoba.
 Date Unknown
 Church of the Theotokos in Hosios Loukas, Byzantine Greece.
 Dormition of the Theotokos Church, Labovë e Kryqit, Albania
 Khakhuli Monastery built in Tao.

See also
9th century in architecture
1000s in architecture
Timeline of architecture

References

Architecture